Tuula Kaarina Laaksalo (born April 21, 1953 in Rovaniemi, Finnish Lapland) is a retired javelin thrower from Finland, who was among the best female javelin throwers in the world in the 1980s. She twice competed for her native country at the Summer Olympics: 1984 and 1988.

Achievements

References
 sports-reference

1953 births
Living people
People from Rovaniemi
Finnish female javelin throwers
Olympic athletes of Finland
Athletes (track and field) at the 1984 Summer Olympics
Athletes (track and field) at the 1988 Summer Olympics
Sportspeople from Lapland (Finland)